Eleanor Frank Weinstock (born January 25, 1929) is an American former politician in the state of Florida.

She served in the Florida House of Representatives from 1978 to 1986 (83rd district). She also served in the Florida Senate from 1987 to 1992.

Weinstock currently resides in Palm Beach, Florida.

References

1929 births
Living people
Politicians from New York City
People from Palm Beach, Florida
Skidmore College alumni
Women state legislators in Florida
Democratic Party Florida state senators
Democratic Party members of the Florida House of Representatives
21st-century American women